A hunger stone (German: Hungerstein) is a type of hydrological landmark common in Central Europe. Hunger stones serve as famine memorials and warnings and were erected in Germany and in ethnic German settlements throughout Europe in the 15th through 19th centuries. 

These stones were embedded into a river during droughts to mark the water level as a warning to future generations that they will have to endure famine-related hardships if the water sinks to this level again. One famous example in the Elbe river in Děčín, Czech Republic, has "Wenn du mich siehst, dann weine" ("If you see me, then weep") carved into it as a warning.

Many of these stones, featuring carvings or other artwork, were erected following the hunger crisis of 1816–1817 caused by the eruptions of the Tambora volcano.

In 1918, a hunger stone on the bed of the Elbe River, near Děčín, became exposed during a period of low water coincident with the wartime famines of World War I. Similar hunger stones in the river were uncovered again during droughts in 2018 and in 2022.

Known hunger stones

Common years

See also 
Nilometer

References

Cultural history of Germany
Droughts in Europe
Famines in Europe
Stones